Scottish Amicable may refer to 
 Scottish Amicable Life Assurance, a mutual society established in 1836  
 Scottish Amicable Building Society, a building society established in 1892